Leonardo da Vinci consolidated University (Université confédérale Léonard de Vinci) is the association of universities and higher education institutions (ComUE) for institutions of higher education and research in the French regions of Centre-Val de Loire and part of the Nouvelle-Aquitaine.

The university was created as a ComUE according to the 2013 Law on Higher Education and Research (France), effective 13 July 2015. Its creation effected a merger between the previously organized associations Centre-Val de Loire University and Limousin Poitou-Charentes Association of Universities.

Members 
The ComUE brings together the following institutions:

 University of Limoges
 University of Orléans
 University of Poitiers
 François Rabelais University (Tours)
 École nationale supérieure de mécanique et d'aérotechnique
 INSA Centre Val de Loire

References

External links 
 
 PDF - Statutes for this ComUE

Universities in France